Ken and Neal Skupski were the defending champions and successfully defended their title, defeating Sander Arends and Antonio Šančić 5–7, 6–3, [10–8] in the final.

Seeds

Draw

References
 Main Draw

Slovak Open - Doubles
2017 Doubles